TEC may refer to:

Education
Technology, the subject itself of technology taught at schools
Tertiary Education Commission (disambiguation)
The East Carolinian, a campus newspaper of East Carolina University

Governmental and public organizations
 The Episcopal Church (United States) 
 Telecommunication Engineering Center, an Indian government agency
 Tsunami Evaluation Coalition, a coalition created to evaluate the response to the 2004 Indian Ocean earthquake
 Transatlantic Economic Council, an agreement between the US and EU
 Training and enterprise council, a former type of UK training program administrator
 Topographic Engineering Center, former name of the US Army Geospatial Center
 Treaty establishing the European Community, a former name for the principal EU Treaty
 Transitional Executive Council, a government body that helped facilitate South Africa's transition to democracy in 1994

Military
 TEC-3 or Technician third grade, United States Army rank
 TEC-4 or Technician fourth grade, United States Army rank
 TEC-5 or Technician fifth grade, United States Army rank
 I.G. Brown Air National Guard Training and Education Center, Knoxville, Tennessee

People
 Nechama Tec, Professor Emerita at the University of Connecticut
 Roland Tec, American writer and movie director

Schools and colleges
 Trichy Engineering College, in Konalai, Tamil Nadu, India
 Costa Rica Institute of Technology
 Monterrey Institute of Technology and Higher Education, in Monterrey, Mexico

Science, engineering and medicine
 TEC (gene), a human gene
 Thermoelectric cooling, a process to create a heat flux between two different materials 
 Time error correction (TEC)
 Transient erythroblastopenia of childhood, a medical condition
 Threshold Exceeds Condition, a value used in computer hard disk evaluation
 Total electron content, a descriptive quantity of the Earth's ionosphere
 Triethylcholine, a drug
 TEC, a Russian abbreviation for thermal power stations in Russia and Soviet Union with combined heat and power plant

Other uses
 Tech (river) (in Pyrénées-Orientales département, southern France
 TEC-9, a semi-automatic pistol
 SV TEC, a Dutch association football club
 Terik language (ISO 639:tec), spoken in Kenya
 Toshiba TEC Corporation, a subsidiary of Toshiba
 Tower en route control, a collection of air-traffic routes
 TRACE Expert City, an office complex in Sri Lanka
 Transport En Commun, a brand name of Belgian transport company Société Régionale Wallonne du Transport
 Turkish Engine Center
 Slang term for a detective